Keelan O'Connell (born 30 November 1999) is an English professional footballer who plays for Weymouth, as a winger.

Early and personal life
O'Connell was born in Portsmouth and attended St John's Primary School and Ferndown Upper School.

Career
O'Connell joined Bournemouth in 2009, and turned professional during the 2015–16 season. He moved on loan to Greenock Morton in January 2019, making his senior debut on 16 February 2019, in a 0–0 league draw against Ayr United.

He signed for Torquay United on 19 July 2021. He moved to Weymouth in July 2022.

References

1999 births
Living people
English footballers
AFC Bournemouth players
Greenock Morton F.C. players
Torquay United F.C. players
Weymouth F.C. players
Scottish Professional Football League players
Association football wingers
Footballers from Portsmouth
National League (English football) players